Berit Digre (born 3 April 1967) is a Norwegian team handball player and Olympic medalist. She received a silver medal at the 1988 Summer Olympics in Seoul with the Norwegian national team. She made 46 international appearances and scored 25 goals. She spent most of her career playing for Sjetne IL.

References

External links

1967 births
Living people
Norwegian female handball players
Olympic silver medalists for Norway
Handball players at the 1988 Summer Olympics
Sportspeople from Trondheim
Olympic medalists in handball
Medalists at the 1988 Summer Olympics